The 2010 special election for the 9th congressional district of Georgia was held on May 11, 2010, to fill the seat left vacant by the resignation of Republican U.S. Representative Nathan Deal, who wished to concentrate on his campaign for Governor of Georgia.  As no candidate received a majority in the special election, a runoff was held on June 8, 2010. The special election had originally been scheduled for April 27, but was postponed for the benefit of military and overseas voters.

Background
Nathan Deal announced he was running for governor on May 1, 2009, and announced on March 1 that he would resign from Congress effective March 8 to pursue his candidacy. He was, however, persuaded to postpone his resignation until after voting on the Senate health care reform bill and health care reconciliation bill. On March 21, less than 10 minutes after the final vote, he officially resigned.

Candidates
The following candidates have qualified for the ballot:

Republicans
Chris Cates, cardiologist and Emory University medical professor
Tom Graves, State Representative in District 12
Lee Hawkins, State Senator in District 49
Bert Loftman, neurosurgeon
Bill Stephens, Vice President of Southern Highlands LLC and former Georgia State Senate Majority Leader
Steve Tarvin, CEO of Crystal Springs Print Works Inc.

Democrat
Mike Freeman, Episcopal minister

Independent
Eugene Moon, marketing manager for Gainesville Welding and Rendering Equipment Inc.

Special election results

Run-off Results
No candidate won a majority of votes on May 11, so a runoff election was held between the two leading candidates, Lee Hawkins and Tom Graves.

References

Georgia 2010 09
Georgia 2010 09
2010 09 Special
Georgia 09 Special
United States House of Representatives 09 Special
United States House of Representatives 2010 09